Calavera is the fifth album by the Chilean band Fiskales Ad-Hok. It was released in 2001 under by the label created by them, CFA. The album has three bonus tracks.

Track listing
"Insomnio"
"Calavera"
"Diablo Verde"
"Tonteras"
"Mi Funeral"
"Sin Zapatos"
"Mundo Cabrón"
"Viva Santiago"
"Guardar la piel"
"En la escuela"
"El patio con rejas en el cielo"
"Rosa Negra"
"Liberación"
"El Ritual"
"Gente Derecha"
"Contra Ellos"
"Sudamérica - No"

Personnel
Alvaro España – vocals
Guardabosques – guitar
Memo – drums
Roly Urzua – bass

2001 albums
Fiskales Ad-Hok albums
Spanish-language albums